Fortune's Rocks may refer to:

Fortune's Rocks (novel), a 1999 novel by Anita Shreve
Fortunes Rocks, Maine, a seaside community in Biddeford, York County, Maine